Dilshad Colony,  is a large housing colony situated in North East Delhi on Delhi Border. The area is mainly developed by private builders.
The demography mostly comprises upper middle class / salaried professionals.Dwellers are mostly well educated. 

It enjoys good connectivity. Adjacent there is Seemapuri DTC Bus Depot & Dilshad Garden Metro Station, approx. 1.5 Kilometres from the colony.
There are 6 small hospitals/clinics inside the colony.
It enjoys fresh water supply from Delhi Jal Board. It has one under ground reservoir(UGR) for daily water needs. Electricity supply is consistent in the area.

Many socio-cultural associations are active in the colony.

There are many grocery stores within the colony including a Kendriya Bhandar & Mother Diary outlet. Also fresh vegetable/fish/meat market is in the vicinity. A line of supermarkets/education/coaching centers/reputed schools exist in the colony and its proximity.
For healthy lifestyle, there are branded/non branded gyms in the colony. Pet stores and veterinary clinics also operate from here.
Parking is a huge problem in the colony, residents park their vehicle in front of buildings and due to which interior roads of the colony gets choked and affects smooth passage of vehicles coming in and out.

The main concern of this place is that there's no place to play cricket even there's a MCD school but the mla and other officials doesn't look into this issue which is a concern for growing kids.

References

Neighbourhoods in Delhi
Shopping districts and streets in India
Cities and towns in North East Delhi district